Gilles Cervara (born 2 January 1981) is a French tennis coach. He has been a coach since 2007, and has worked full-time with Daniil Medvedev since summer 2017, helping him capture fourteen ATP Tour singles titles and reach a career-high ranking of World No. 1. Cervara's previous job as a hitting partner included such famous clients as Thomas Enqvist, Justine Henin, and Marat Safin.

Cervara was chosen by his peers as Coach of the Year in the 2019 ATP Awards. He was nominated for the award again in 2020 and in 2021, but the award was eventually bestowed on Fernando Vicente and Facundo Lugones, respectively.

References

External links
Gilles Cervara ATP coach profile

French tennis coaches
1981 births
Living people
Sportspeople from Cannes